The 2010 Cincinnati Bengals season was the 41st season for the team in the National Football League (NFL), and their 43rd overall. The Bengals looked to improve on their 10–6 record from 2009, during which they swept the AFC North for the first time in team history and made the playoffs as division champions. At the conclusion of the season, however, the Bengals finished 4–12 and were unable to qualify for the playoffs.

Offseason

2010 Draft

* – Compensatory Selection

Staff

Roster

Schedule

Preseason
On February 24, 2010, the NFL announced that the Bengals will face the Dallas Cowboys in the Pro Football Hall of Fame Game at Fawcett Stadium in Canton, Ohio. The game occurred on Sunday, August 8, 2010, and was aired by NBC. The Bengals were the designated home team.

The Bengals' preseason opponents were announced on March 31, 2010.  The finalized dates and times were announced on April 9, 2010.

Regular season

Note: Intra-division opponents are in bold text.

Standings

Preseason results
Pro Football Hall of Fame Game – vs Dallas Cowboys

Preseason Week 1 – vs Denver Broncos

Preseason Week 2 – vs Philadelphia Eagles

Regular season results

Week 1: at New England Patriots

The Cincinnati Bengals began their season at Gillette Stadium for an AFC duel with the New England Patriots. In the first quarter, the Bengals trailed early when Patriots quarterback Tom Brady got a 9-yard TD pass to wide receiver Wes Welker, followed by kicker Stephen Gostkowski hitting a 32-yard field goal. In the second quarter, the Bengals struggled further when Brady made a 4-yard TD pass to Wes Welker, followed by linebacker Gary Guyton returning an interception 59 yards for a touchdown. Then, the Bengals made their first score of the half when kicker Mike Nugent nailed a 54-yard field goal.

In the third quarter, the Patriots increased their lead when wide receiver Brandon Tate returned the second half's opening kickoff 97 yards for a touchdown. After that, the Bengals replied with quarterback Carson Palmer making a 1-yard TD pass to tight end Jermaine Gresham, followed by Palmer's 28-yard touchdown pass to wide receiver Chad Ochocinco. In the fourth quarter, the Patriots scored again with Brady making a 1-yard TD pass to tight end Rob Gronkowski. The Bengals replied with running back Cedric Benson making a 1-yard TD run, but Cincinnati couldn't get any closer to New England's lead.

With the loss, the Bengals began their season at 0–1.

Week 2: vs. Baltimore Ravens

Hoping to rebound from their loss to the Patriots the Bengals played on home ground for an AFC North rivalry match against the Ravens. In the 2nd quarter Cincinnati took the early lead as kicker Mike Nugent hit a 36 and a 30-yard field goal. In the third quarter the Ravens replied and took the lead with QB Joe Flacco completing a 31-yard TD pass to WR Derrick Mason. The Bengals replied when Nugent hit a 46-yard field goal. The Bengals fell behind again in the fourth quarter when kicker Billy Cundiff made a 38-yard field goal, but they got the win with Nugent making 38 and a 25-yard field goals.

With the win, the Bengals improved to 1–1 and picked up their 8th straight division victory.

Week 3: at Carolina Panthers

Coming off their divisional home win over the Ravens, the Bengals flew to Bank of America Stadium for a Week 3 interconference duel with the Carolina Panthers.  Cincinnati would strike first in the opening half as running back Cedric Benson got a 1-yard touchdown run in the first quarter, while kicker Mike Nugent got a 33-yard field goal.  The Panthers would answer in the third quarter as running back Jonathan Stewart got a 1-yard touchdown run, yet the Bengals would close out the game in the fourth quarter as Nugent nailed a 50-yard field goal, followed by quarterback Carson Palmer finding Benson on a 7-yard touchdown pass.

With the win, Cincinnati improved to 2–1.

Week 4: at Cleveland Browns

Coming off their road win over the Panthers, the Bengals flew to Cleveland Browns Stadium for their Week 4 AFC North duel with the Cleveland Browns in Round 1 of 2010's Battle of Ohio.  Cincinnati would trail early in the first quarter as Browns kicker Phil Dawson made a 30-yard field goal.  Cleveland would add onto their lead in the second quarter as quarterback Seneca Wallace completed a 24-yard touchdown pass to tight end Evan Moore.  Afterwards, the Bengals tied the game as kicker Mike Nugent got a 24-yard field goal, followed by quarterback Carson Palmer completing a 78-yard touchdown pass to wide receiver Terrell Owens.  The Browns would close out the half with Dawson getting a 31-yard field goal.

In the third quarter, Cleveland responded with running back Peyton Hillis' 1-yard touchdown run, followed by Dawson nailing a 22-yard field goal.  Afterwards, Cincinnati came right back with Nugent's 25-yard field goal.  The Bengals tried to rally in the fourth quarter as Palmer found running back Brian Leonard on a 3-yard touchdown pass, but the Browns' defense would prevent any further progress.

With the loss, not only did Cincinnati fall to 2–2.  The Browns also improve to 1–3 and prevented the Bengals from a 9th straight division rival win.

Week 5: vs. Tampa Bay Buccaneers

The Bengals' 5th game was an Interconference duel with the Buccaneers at home. In the 1st quarter Cincinnati took the early lead as QB Carson Palmer made a 43-yard TD pass to WR Terrell Owens. The Buccaneers replied in the 2nd quarter with FS Cody Grimm returning an interception 11 yards for a touchdown. Then kicker Mike Nugent made a 31-yard field goal to put the Bengals up 10–7. In the 3rd quarter the Bengals fell behind as FB Earnest Graham made a 1-yard TD run; but they replied with Nugent making a 35-yard field goal. The Bengals took the lead with Palmer finding TE Jermaine Gresham on a 1-yard TD pass (With a successful 2-point conversion as RB Cedric Benson ran to the endzone), but the lead didn't last very long as QB Josh Freeman completed a 20-yard TD pass to WR Mike Williams. The decision was made when kicker Connor Barth made a 31-yard field goal to give the Bengals another loss.

With the loss, the Bengals went into their bye week at 2–3.

Week 7: at Atlanta Falcons

Coming off their bye week the Bengals played at Georgia Dome for an interconference duel with the Falcons. In the first quarter the Bengals trailed early as QB Matt Ryan made a 3-yard TD pass to WR Brian Finneran. But they replied with kicker Mike Nugent making a 20-yard field goal. The Bengals struggled in the second quarter with kicker Matt Bryant hitting a 45-yard field goal. Then Ryan found WR Roddy White on a 43-yard TD pass, followed by RB Michael Turner getting a 2-yard TD run. The Bengals took control in the third quarter with Nugent nailing a 33-yard field goal, followed by QB Carson Palmer completing a 19-yard TD pass to WR Terrell Owens. Then Palmer found WR Jordan Shipley on a 64-yard TD pass. Then DB Adam Jones returned a fumble 59 yards to the endzone for a touchdown (With a failed two-point conversion). The Falcons pulled away in the fourth quarter with Ryan making an 11-yard TD pass to White. (With the 2-point conversion successful as Ryan passed to White) This was followed by Turner getting a 3-yard TD run. The Bengals tried to tie the game, but only came away with one touchdown after Palmer found WR Chad Ochocinco on an 8-yard TD pass.

With the loss, the Bengals fell to 2–4.

Week 8: vs. Miami Dolphins

Hoping to break their current losing streak the Bengals played on home ground for an AFC duel with the Dolphins. In the first quarter the Bengals took the lead as QB Carson Palmer got a 7-yard TD pass to WR Terrell Owens. The Dolphins replied with kicker Dan Carpenter hitting a 38 and a 42-yard field goal. The Bengals increased their lead with Palmer finding Owens again on a 37-yard TD pass. The Dolphins caught up and eventually took the lead with Carpenter hitting a 24, 54, and a 31-yard field goal in the third quarter to put the Dolphins up 15–14. The Bengals fell further behind with RB Ricky Williams making a 1-yard TD run.

With the loss, the Bengals fell to 2–5.

Week 9: vs. Pittsburgh Steelers

Trying to snap a four-game losing streak, the Bengals stayed at home for a Week 9 AFC North duel with the Pittsburgh Steelers on Monday night.  Cincinnati trailed early as Steelers running back Rashard Mendenhall got a 1-yard touchdown run, followed by kicker Jeff Reed getting a 25-yard field goal.  The Bengals answered in the second quarter as quarterback Carson Palmer found wide receiver Terrell Owens on a 19-yard touchdown pass, but Pittsburgh responded with quarterback Ben Roethlisberger completing an 8-yard touchdown pass to wide receiver Hines Ward, followed by a 53-yard field goal from Reed.  After a scoreless third quarter, Cincinnati's deficit increased as wide receiver Antwaan Randle El completed a 39-yard touchdown pass to wide receiver Mike Wallace.  The Bengals tried to rally as Palmer hooked up with Owens again on a 27-yard touchdown pass, followed by a 1-yard touchdown run from running back Cedric Benson.  However, the Steelers' defense held on to preserve the win.

With the loss, Cincinnati fell to 2–6 and matched their 2009 loss total.

Week 10: at Indianapolis Colts

Trying to break a five-game losing streak the Bengals flew to Lucas Oil Stadium for an AFC duel with the Colts. In the first quarter the Bengals had problems when kicker Adam Vinatieri got a 28-yard field goal, followed by QB Carson Palmer's pass being intercepted by CB Kelvin Hayden and returned 31 yards for a touchdown. This was followed in the second quarter by RB Javarris James getting a 3-yard TD run. They eventually scored with kicker Mike Nugent nailing a 27-yard field goal, followed by Palmer finding WR Chad Ochocinco on a 5-yard TD pass. The Bengals fell further behind when Vinatieri made a 47-yard field goal, followed in the fourth quarter by his 23-yard field goal. The Bengals only came back with 1 touchdown when Palmer connected to TE Jermaine Gresham on a 19-yard TD pass.

With the loss, Cincinnati fell to 2–7 and surpassed their 2009 loss total.

Week 11: vs. Buffalo Bills

The Bengals' tenth game was an AFC duel with the Bills. In the first quarter the Bengals took the lead when QB Carson Palmer completed a 2-yard TD pass to WR Chad Ochocinco. The Bills replied with RB Fred Jackson getting a 7-yard TD run. The Bengals pulled ahead with Palmer completing a 4-yard TD pass to WR Terrell Owens, and with RB Cedric Benson getting a 1-yard TD run, followed by CB Johnathan Joseph returning an interception 21 yards for a touchdown. The lead was narrowed when Fitzpatrick made a 28-yard TD pass to WR Donald Jones, but the Bengals increased their lead with kicker Aaron Pettrey nailing a 19-yard field goal. The lead was narrowed again in the third quarter with Fitzpatrick completing a 28-yard TD pass to WR Stevie Johnson, and with CB Drayton Florence recovering a fumble and returning the ball 27 yards for a touchdown. In the fourth quarter the Bengals fell behind with Fitzpatrick finding Johnson again on an 11 and a 32-yard TD pass. This was followed by Jackson getting a 30-yard TD run.

With the loss, the Bengals fell to 2–8.

Week 12: at New York Jets (Thanksgiving Classic)

Trying to snap a seven-game losing streak, the Bengals flew to New Meadowlands Stadium for a Week 12 Thanksgiving duel with the New York Jets.  After a scoreless first quarter, Cincinnati trailed in the second quarter as Jets kicker Nick Folk got a 27-yard field goal.  The Bengals would take the lead as quarterback Carson Palmer found wide receiver Jordan Shipley on a 5-yard touchdown pass.

New York regained the lead in the third quarter with wide receiver/quarterback Brad Smith getting a 53-yard touchdown run, followed by quarterback Mark Sanchez completing a 13-yard touchdown pass to wide receiver Santonio Holmes.  Cincinnati tried to rally in the fourth quarter with a 28-yard field goal from rookie kicker Aaron Pettrey, but the Jets came right back with Smith's 89-yard kickoff return for a touchdown, followed by defensive end Trevor Pryce sacking Palmer in the endzone for safety.

With the loss, the Bengals fell to 2–9, and were officially eliminated from postseason contention with other results in Week 12.

Week 13: vs. New Orleans Saints

Trying to break an eight-game losing streak the Bengals played on home ground for an interconference duel with the Saints. In the first quarter, the Bengals trailed early as kicker Garrett Hartley nailed a 48-yard field goal. They replied with kicker Clint Stitser hitting a 29-yard field goal, but the Saints scored again with RB Chris Ivory getting a 55-yard TD run, with the Bengals responding as Stitser made a 23-yard field goal. They struggled further as Hartley made a 24-yard field goal, followed by Ivory getting a 1-yard TD run. The Bengals narrowed the lead as QB Carson Palmer made a 5-yard TD pass to WR Terrell Owens (With a failed PAT as the kick went wide right), followed by RB Cedric Benson getting a 1-yard TD run. The Saints responded as QB Drew Brees completed a 52-yard TD pass to WR Robert Meachem, but the Bengals fought back to take the lead for the first time with Benson gettingt a 4-yard TD run (With a successful 2-point conversion as Palmer passed to TE Jermaine Gresham), followed by Stitser making a 47-yard field goal. They failed to maintain this lead after Brees threw a 3-yard TD pass to WR Marques Colston.

With the loss, the Bengals fell to 2–10.

Week 14: at Pittsburgh Steelers

Trying to snap a nine-game losing streak, the Bengals flew to Heinz Field for a Week 14 AFC North rematch with the Pittsburgh Steelers. In the first quarter, Cincinnati delivered the game's opening strike in the first quarter as quarterback Carson Palmer found offensive tackle Andrew Whitworth on a 1-yard touchdown pass.  In the second quarter, the Steelers answered with safety Troy Polamalu returning an interception 45 yards for a touchdown; followed by kicker Shaun Suisham nailing a 23-yard field goal.

In the third quarter, Pittsburgh added onto their lead with Suisham getting a 35-yard field goal. In the fourth quarter, the Steelers pulled away with linebacker LaMarr Woodley returning an interception 14 yards for a touchdown, followed by Suisham making a 41-yard field goal.

With the loss, the Bengals fell to 2–11.

Week 15: vs. Cleveland Browns

Hoping to break a 10-game losing streak the Bengals played on home ground for an AFC North rivalry rematch against the Browns. In the first quarter the Bengals trailed early as QB Colt McCoy threw a 20-yard TD pass to TE Robert Royal; but they rallied to get the lead back with RB Cedric Benson getting an 18-yard TD run, followed by kicker Clint Stitser nailing a 25, 39 and a 34-yard field goal. The lead was narrowed with kicker Phil Dawson making a 23-yard field goal, but the Bengals rebuilt their 9-point lead with Stitser making a 20-yard field goal. The lead was narrowed again with McCoy completing a 46-yard TD pass to WR Brian Robiskie, but the Bengals defense was solid enough to hold them on for the win.

With the close win, Cincinnati improved to 3–11.

Week 16: vs. San Diego Chargers

Coming off their win over the Browns the Bengals played on home ground for an AFC duel with the Chargers who were coming off two blowout wins and were still alive for a playoff birth at 8-6. In the first quarter the Bengals took the lead with QB Carson Palmer throwing a 3-yard TD pass to TE Jermaine Gresham. Then Palmer found WR Jerome Simpson on a 10-yard TD pass (PAT failed, wide left). The Chargers got on the board with kicker Nate Kaeding hitting a 20-yard field goal, followed by RB Ryan Mathews getting a 23-yard TD run, but the Bengals put more points up with Palmer getting a 3-yard TD pass to WR Jordan Shipley. The lead was narrowed with Kaeding making a 28-yard field goal, but the Bengals increased their lead after Palmer connected to Simpson on a 59-yard TD pass, followed by RB Bernard Scott getting a 10-yard TD run. The Chargers tried to come back after QB Philip Rivers made a 5-yard TD pass to WR Kelley Washington, but the Bengals defense prevented any more scoring chances, giving themselves the win.

With the win, the Bengals improved to 4–11 and effectively ended the Chargers playoff hopes.

Week 17: at Baltimore Ravens

The Bengals' final game was a division rivalry rematch against the Ravens. The Bengals trailed throughout the game as kicker Billy Cundiff hit a 25 and a 47-yard field goal. This was followed by Ray Rice getting a 7-yard TD run. The lead was only narrowed with QB Carson Palmer throwing an 11-yard TD pass to WR Jerome Simpson, but the Bengals couldn't do any more, snapping their two-game winning streak and thus ending the season on a 4–12 record which would be the team's worst record under Marvin Lewis.

References

Cincinnati
Cincinnati Bengals seasons
Cincin